Jean Frances Tatlock (February 21, 1914 – January 4, 1944) was an American psychiatrist and physician. She was a member of the Communist Party of the United States of America and was a reporter and writer for the party's publication Western Worker. She is also known for her romantic relationship with J. Robert Oppenheimer, the director of the Manhattan Project's Los Alamos Laboratory during World War II.

The daughter of John Strong Perry Tatlock, a prominent Old English philologist and an expert on Geoffrey Chaucer, Tatlock was a graduate of Vassar College and the Stanford Medical School, where she studied to become a psychiatrist. Tatlock began seeing Oppenheimer in 1936, when she was a graduate student at Stanford and Oppenheimer was a professor of physics at the University of California, Berkeley. As a result of their relationship and her membership of the Communist Party, she was placed under surveillance by the FBI and her phone was tapped.

She suffered from clinical depression and died by suicide on January 4, 1944.

Early life
Jean Frances Tatlock was born in Ann Arbor, Michigan, on February 21, 1914, the second child of John Strong Perry Tatlock and his wife Marjorie  Fenton. She had an older brother named Hugh, who became a physician. Her father, who had a PhD from Harvard University, was a noted and acclaimed professor of English at the University of Michigan; an Old English philologist; an expert on Geoffrey Chaucer and English plays, poems, and Elizabethan era literature; and author of approximately 60 books on those subjects, including The Complete Poetical Works of Geoffrey Chaucer (1912) and The Mind and Art of Chaucer (1950). John Tatlock was a professor of English at Stanford from 1915 to 1925, and Harvard from 1925 to 1929, before returning to the Bay Area as a professor of English at the University of California, Berkeley.

Tatlock attended Cambridge Rindge and Latin School in Cambridge, Massachusetts, and Williams College in Berkeley. In 1930, she entered Vassar College. She graduated in 1935, and returned to Berkeley, where she took courses to complete the prerequisites for Stanford Medical School, and was a reporter and writer for the Western Worker, the Communist Party of America's organ on the West Coast of the United States. She was accepted into Stanford Medical School (then located in San Francisco), where she studied to become a psychiatrist. She graduated from Stanford  with the class of 1941, and completed her internship at St. Elizabeths Hospital in Washington, D.C., and residency at the Department of Psychiatry at Mount Zion Hospital (now the University of California, San Francisco Medical Center) in San Francisco.

Romance with Oppenheimer
Tatlock struggled with her sexuality, at one point writing to a friend that "there was a period when I thought I was homosexual. I still am, in a way, forced to believe it, but really, logically, I am sure that I can't be because of my un-masculinity." She began seeing Robert Oppenheimer in 1936, when she was a graduate student there and Oppenheimer was a professor of physics at Berkeley. They met through his landlady, Mary Ellen Washburn, who was also a member of the Communist Party, when Washburn held a fund raiser for communist-backed Spanish Republicans. The couple started dating and had a passionate relationship; he proposed to her twice, but she refused. She is credited with introducing Oppenheimer to radical politics during the late 1930s, and to people involved with, or sympathetic to the Communist Party or related groups, such as Rudy Lambert and Thomas Addis. They continued seeing each other after he became involved with Kitty Harrison, whom he married on November 1, 1940. Oppenheimer and Tatlock  spent the New Year together in 1941, and once met at Mark Hopkins hotel in San Francisco.

Oppenheimer's association with her friends was used as evidence against him during his 1954 security hearing. In a letter to Major General Kenneth D. Nichols, General Manager, United States Atomic Energy Commission, dated March 4, 1954, Oppenheimer described their association as follows:

While some historians believe that Oppenheimer had an extramarital affair with Tatlock while he was working on the Manhattan Project, others assert he met with Tatlock only once after he was picked to head the Los Alamos Laboratory in mid-June 1943. On June 14, 1943, Oppenheimer was in Berkeley to recruit David Hawkins as an administrative assistant. They went to a Mexican restaurant in her green 1935 Plymouth coupe, and spent the night together at her San Francisco apartment at 1405 Montgomery Street. All the while, U.S. Army agents, waiting in the street outside, had them under surveillance.  At that meeting she told him that she still loved him and wanted to be with him. He never saw her again.

Despite her relationship with Oppenheimer, in Edith Arnstein Jenkins' memoir, she recalls a conversation with Mason Robertson, a good friend of Tatlock, in which he claims Tatlock told him she was lesbian. In fact, it is plausible that Tatlock had a relationship with Mary Ellen Washburn. As a psychoanalyst in the 1940s, she saw her homosexuality as a pathological condition to be overcome, which may have led to her eventual suicide.

Death
Tatlock suffered from severe clinical depression, and was being treated at Mount Zion. At around 1 pm on January 5, 1944, her father arrived at her apartment at 1405 Montgomery Street. When there was no response to his ringing the doorbell, he climbed in through a window. He found her dead, lying on a pile of cushions in the bathroom, with her head submerged in the partly-filled bathtub. There was an unsigned suicide note, which read:

Her father found her correspondence and sifted through it, burning letters and photographs in the fireplace. At 5:10 pm he called the Halstead Funeral Home, who contacted the police. The police arrived at 5:30 pm, accompanied by the deputy coroner. At the time of her death she was under surveillance by the FBI, and her phone had been tapped, so one of the first people informed about it was FBI director J. Edgar Hoover, via a teletype link. The news of her death was reported in Bay Area newspapers.

Washburn cabled Charlotte Serber at Los Alamos. As the librarian, she had access to the Technical Area, and told her husband, physicist Robert Serber, who then went to inform Oppenheimer. When he reached his office, he found that Oppenheimer already knew. The security chief at Los Alamos, Captain Peer de Silva, had received the news through the wiretap and Army Intelligence, and had broken it to Oppenheimer. Tatlock had introduced Oppenheimer to the poetry of John Donne, and it is widely believed he named the first test of a nuclear weapon "Trinity" in reference to one of Donne's poems, as a tribute to her. In 1962, Leslie Groves wrote to Oppenheimer about the origin of the name, and elicited this reply:

A formal inquest in February 1944 returned a verdict of "Suicide, motive unknown". In his report, the coroner found that Tatlock had eaten a full meal shortly before her death. She had taken some barbiturates, but not a fatal dose. Traces of chloral hydrate were found, a drug normally associated with a "Mickey Finn" when combined with alcohol, but there was no alcohol in her blood, despite damage to her pancreas that indicated she was a heavy drinker. As a psychiatrist working in a hospital, she had access to sedatives such as chloral hydrate. The coroner found that she had died at around 4:30 pm on January 4. The cause of death was recorded as "acute edema of the lungs with pulmonary congestion" — drowning in the bathtub. It seems likely that she knelt over the bathtub, took chloral hydrate, and plunged her head into the water.

There has been, at times, speculation by historians and her brother Hugh as to whether her death was truly a suicide, as there were some suspicious circumstances. The conspiracy theory that she was murdered by intelligence agents working for the Manhattan Project was bolstered by the 1975 Church Committee, which revealed details of assassinations carried out by American intelligence agencies, and was depicted in the fictional TV series Manhattan. One doctor observed that: "If you were clever and wanted to kill someone, this is the way to do it."

Her father had her remains cremated.

Legacy

In media 
Florence Pugh is set to depict Jean in the upcoming 2023 biopic film Oppenheimer by Christopher Nolan.

Natasha Richardson portrayed Jean in the 1989 film Fat Man and Little Boy by Roland Joffé

Notes

References

 
 
 
 

 
 
 

 
 
 

1914 births
1944 suicides
People from Ann Arbor, Michigan
Vassar College alumni
Stanford University alumni
University of California, Berkeley alumni
Physicians from California
American women psychiatrists
American psychiatrists
Stanford University School of Medicine alumni
American communists
Suicides by drowning in the United States
Cambridge Rindge and Latin School alumni
Bisexual women
J. Robert Oppenheimer
Members of the Communist Party USA
Communist women writers
LGBT people from Michigan